The Ninetology Vox (C1240) is a dual band GSM 900/1800 color mobile phone manufactured by Ninetology with dual SIM capabilities. It was announced in November 2012 via a campaign called VOX G.O.L.D Fund that aimed to raise donations funds for Yayasan Maha Karuna.

Hardware Specifications
The Ninetology Vox (C1240) has a MT 6250 single core (260 MHz) processor. Its dimensions are 115.6 mm (H) x 49.6 mm (W) x 14.5 mm (T) and weighs 88 grams.

It possesses a 2.4-inch IPS display screen with a 240 x 320 resolution and is capable of producing up to 65K colors. It is also equipped with a 1.3 MP rear-facing camera.

The battery has a capacity of Li-Ion 1200 mAh, and additional storage is available via a MicroSD card socket, which is certified to support up to 8 GB of additional storage.

VOX Gold
The VOX G.O.L.D Fund campaign organized by Ninetology aims to raise donations funds for Yayasan Maha Karuna. Ninetology does this by donating a large percentage of its accumulated sales from its Vox model to the organization.

References

External links
http://ninetology.com/landing.html

Mobile phones
Mobile telecommunications